Skyline is an open source software for targeted proteomics and metabolomics data analysis. It runs on Microsoft Windows and supports the raw data formats from multiple mass spectrometric vendors. It contains a graphical user interface to display chromatographic data for individual peptide or small molecule analytes.

Skyline supports multiple workflows including selected reaction monitoring (SRM) / multiple reaction monitoring (MRM), parallel reaction monitoring (PRM), data-independent acquisition (DIA/SWATH) and targeted data-dependent acquisition.

See also 
 ProteoWizard
 OpenMS
 Trans-Proteomic Pipeline
 Mass spectrometry software

References

External links 
 

Free science software
Bioinformatics software
Mass spectrometry software
Proteomics
Software using the Apache license